Vítor Manuel Borges Moreno (born 29 November 1980, in Lisbon) is a Cape Verdean former footballer who played as a right back.

External links

1980 births
Living people
Portuguese people of Cape Verdean descent
Citizens of Cape Verde through descent
Footballers from Lisbon
Cape Verdean footballers
Association football defenders
Primeira Liga players
Liga Portugal 2 players
Segunda Divisão players
Odivelas F.C. players
F.C. Barreirense players
G.D. Estoril Praia players
Vitória S.C. players
C.F. Estrela da Amadora players
U.D. Leiria players
Atlético Clube de Portugal players
Portimonense S.C. players
C.D. Cova da Piedade players
C.D. Pinhalnovense players
Segunda División B players
AD Ceuta footballers
Cape Verde international footballers
Cape Verdean expatriate footballers
Expatriate footballers in Portugal
Expatriate footballers in Spain